Events in the year 1955 in Brazil.

Incumbents

Federal government
 President: Café Filho (until November 22); Carlos Luz (from November 22) 
 Vice President:

Governors
 Alagoas: Arnon de Mello
 Amazonas: Álvaro Botelho Maia/Plínio Ramos Coelho
 Bahia: Régis Pacheco/Antônio Balbino
 Ceará: Stênio Gomes da Silva/Paulo Sarasate
 Espírito Santo: Francisco Alves Ataíde/	Francisco Lacerda de Aguiar
 Goiás: José Ludovico de Almeida 
 Maranhão: 
 Mato Grosso: Fernando Corrêa da Costa
 Minas Gerais: Juscelino Kubitschek/Clóvis Salgado da Gama 
 Pará: Zacarias de Assumpção 
 Paraíba: José Américo de Almeida
 Paraná: Bento Munhoz da Rocha Neto then Antonio Annibelli then Adolfo de Oliveira Franco 
 Pernambuco: Etelvino Lins de Albuquerque/Osvaldo Cordeiro de Farias 
 Piauí: Pedro Freitas/Jacob Gaioso e Almendra 
 Rio de Janeiro: Amaral Peixoto/Miguel Couto Filho                                                      
 Rio Grande do Norte: Silvio Piza Pedrosa 
 Rio Grande do Sul: Ernesto Dornelles/Ildo Meneghetti 
 Santa Catarina: Irineu Bornhausen 
 São Paulo: Lucas Nogueira Garcez/Jânio Quadros 
 Sergipe: Arnaldo Rollemberg Garcez/Leandro Maciel

Vice governors
 Alagoas: Sizenando Nabuco de Melo 
 Ceará: Wilson Gonçalves 
 Espírito Santo: Francisco Alves Ataíde/Adwalter Ribeiro Soares
 Goiás: Bernardo Sayão Carvalho Araújo 
 Maranhão: Renato Bayma Archer da Silva 
 Mato Grosso: João Leite de Barros 
 Minas Gerais: Clóvis Salgado da Gama
 Paraíba: João Fernandes de Lima 
 Piauí: Tertuliano Milton Brandão/Francisco Ferreira de Castro 
 Rio de Janeiro: Tarcísio Miranda/Roberto Silveira
 Rio Grande do Norte: vacant
 São Paulo: Erlindo Salzano/Porfírio da Paz 
 Sergipe: Edelzio Vieira de Melo/José Machado de Souza

Events
October 3 - The presidential election results in victory for Juscelino Kubitschek, who receives 35.7% of the vote.  
November 3 - Café Filho is forced to give up the presidency of Brazil on health grounds.  Kubitschek does not take office until the following year.
date unknown 
The Museum of Modern Art, Rio de Janeiro, is completed, a Modernist concrete museum building, designed by Affonso Eduardo Reidy, with gardens designed by Burle Marx.
The Latin American Episcopal Conference is founded in Rio de Janeiro.

Culture and the arts

Books
Osman Lins - 0 Visitante

Drama
Ariano Suassuna - O Auto da Compadecida

Births
 January 2 - Edson Leal Pujol, army general
March 16 - Bruno Barreto, film director
March 21 - Jair Bolsonaro, president of Brazil
June 24 - Betty Lago, actress (died 2015)
July 17 - Luiz Alberto Figueiredo, diplomat and politician

Deaths
March 23 - Arthur Bernardes, politician (born 1875)

References

See also 
1955 in Brazilian football

 
1950s in Brazil
Years of the 20th century in Brazil
Brazil
Brazil